Michael Edwin Akam FRS (born 19 June 1952, in Bromley, Kent) is a British zoologist. He is professorial fellow of Darwin College, Cambridge, and he is a director, University Museum of Zoology.

He was Damon Runyan fellow at Stanford University, from 1979 to 1981.
He is American Association for the Advancement of Science fellow.

Works
 Michael Akam (Ed), The evolution of developmental mechanisms, Issue 1, Company of Biologists, 1994,

References

20th-century British zoologists
1952 births
People from Bromley
Fellows of the Royal Society
Fellows of Darwin College, Cambridge
Living people
21st-century British zoologists
Professors of Zoology (Cambridge, 1866)